Efe Üstündağ (born 15 January 1977) is a Turkish former professional tennis player. He was a member of the Turkey Davis Cup team from 1998 to 2001 and won two ITF Futures doubles titles.

Üstündağ, a native of Istanbul, has been Rice University men's head coach since 2012. He was both the 2016 and 2017 C-USA tennis Coach of the Year. A former Rice University player, Üstündağ twice earned All-American honors. In 1999 he and Shane Stone were NCAA doubles quarter-finalists.

ITF Futures finals

Doubles: 6 (2–4)

References

External links
 
 
 

1977 births
Living people
Turkish male tennis players
Rice Owls men's tennis players
Rice Owls men's tennis coaches
Sportspeople from Istanbul
20th-century Turkish people